This is a list of episodes for The Colbert Report in 2013.

2013

January

February

March

April

May

June 
Taping of June 13, 17 and 18 was cancelled due to the death of Colbert's mother.

July

August

September

October

November

December

References

External links

 
 

2013
2013 American television seasons
2013 in American television